High-density polyethylene (HDPE) or polyethylene high-density (PEHD) is a thermoplastic polymer produced from the monomer ethylene. It is sometimes called "alkathene" or "polythene" when used for HDPE pipes. With a high strength-to-density ratio, HDPE is used in the production of plastic bottles, corrosion-resistant piping, geomembranes and plastic lumber. HDPE is commonly recycled, and has the number "2" as its resin identification code.

In 2007, the global HDPE market reached a volume of more than 30 million tons.

Properties 

HDPE is known for its high strength-to-density ratio. The density of HDPE ranges from 930 to 970 kg/m3. The standard method to test plastic density is  ISO 1183 part 2 (gradient columns), alternatively ISO 1183 part 1 (MVS2PRO density analyzer). Although the density of HDPE is only marginally higher than that of low-density polyethylene, HDPE has little branching, giving it stronger intermolecular forces and tensile strength (38 MPa versus 21 MPa) than LDPE. The difference in strength exceeds the difference in density, giving HDPE a higher specific strength. It is also harder and more opaque and can withstand somewhat higher temperatures (120 °C/248 °F for short periods). High-density polyethylene, unlike polypropylene, cannot withstand normally required autoclaving conditions. The lack of branching is ensured by an appropriate choice of catalyst (e.g., Ziegler–Natta catalysts) and reaction conditions.

High DPE is resistant to many different solvents, so it cannot be glued. Pipe joints must be made by welding.

The physical properties of HDPE can vary depending on the molding process that is used to manufacture a specific sample; to some degree, a determining factor is the international standardized testing methods employed to identify these properties for a specific process. For example, in rotational molding, to identify the environmental stress crack resistance of a sample, the notched constant tensile load test (NCTL) is put to use.

Owing to these desirable properties, pipes constructed out of HDPE are ideally applicable for drinking water and waste water (storm and sewage).

Applications

HDPE has a wide variety of applications; for applications that fall within the properties of other polymers, the choice to use HDPE is usually economic:
 3D printer filament
 Arena board (puck board)
 Backpacking frames
 Ballistic plates
 Banners
 Bottle caps
 Boats
 Chemical containers
 Chemical-resistant piping
 Coax cable inner insulator
 Conduit protector for electrical or communications cables
 Corrosion protection for steel pipelines
 Electrical and plumbing boxes
 Far-IR lenses
 Fireworks
 Folding chairs and tables
 Food storage containers
 Fuel tanks for vehicles
 Geomembrane for hydraulic applications (such as canals and bank reinforcements)
 Geothermal heat transfer piping systems
 Heat-resistant firework mortars
 Housewrap (Tyvek)
 Hovercraft: The material is too heavy and dense for such craft but is still used occasionally
 Ionizing radiation shield
Laundry detergent jugs
 Lasts for shoes
 Microwave telescope windows
 Milk jugs
 Natural gas distribution pipe systems
 Piping for fluid, slurry and gas purposes
 Plastic bags
 Plastic bottles suitable both for recycling or re-use
 Plastic surgery (skeletal and facial reconstruction)
 Potable water mains
 Root barrier
 Shampoo bottles
 Sewage mains
 Snowboard rails and boxes
 Stone paper
 Storage sheds
 Swimming pool installation
 Trackout control mats
 Telecom ducts
 Water pipes for domestic water supply and agricultural processes
 Wood plastic composites (utilizing recycled polymers)

HDPE is also used for cell liners in United States subtitle D sanitary landfills, wherein large sheets of HDPE are either extrusion welded or wedge welded to form a homogeneous chemical-resistant barrier, with the intention of preventing the pollution of soil and groundwater by the liquid constituents of solid waste.

HDPE is preferred by the pyrotechnics trade for mortars over steel or PVC tubes, being more durable and safer: HDPE tends to rip or tear in a malfunction instead of shattering and becoming shrapnel like the other materials.

Milk bottles, jugs, and other hollow goods manufactured through blow molding are the most important application area for HDPE, accounting for one-third of worldwide production, or more than 8 million tonnes.

Above all, China, where beverage bottles made from HDPE were first imported in 2005, is a growing market for rigid HDPE packaging, as a result of its improving standard of living. In India and other highly populated, emerging nations, infrastructure expansion includes the deployment of pipes and cable insulation made from HDPE. The material has benefited from discussions about possible health and environmental problems caused by PVC and polycarbonate associated bisphenol A (BPA), as well as its advantages over glass, metal, and cardboard.

See also
 
 Cross-linked polyethylene (PEX)
 HDPE pipe (HDPE)
 Low-density polyethylene (LDPE)
 Linear low-density polyethylene (LLDPE)
 Medium-density polyethylene (MDPE)
 Phillips Disaster
 Plastic recycling
 Polyethylene (PE)
 Resin identification code
 Stretch wrap
 Ultra-high-molecular-weight polyethylene (UHMWPE)

References

Plastics
Polyolefins

de:Polyethylen